Lester Sill (January 13, 1918 – October 31, 1994) was an American record label executive, best remembered as Phil Spector's partner in Philles Records (the name came from the first parts of their names, Phil and Les), and also as the head of both Colpix Records and the later Colgems Records. His three sons are music supervisors in the film and TV businesses: Joel Sill, Greg Sill and Lonnie Sill. His stepson Chuck Kaye is a longtime music publishing executive.

Biography
Sill was an omnipresent force in the development of West Coast R&B and rock & roll, shepherding the fledgling career of the songwriting team of Jerry Leiber and Mike Stoller before teaming with the producer Phil Spector to found Philles Records, the premier U.S. pop label of the early 1960s.

Born January 13, 1918, in Los Angeles, Sill first entered show business as a nightclub owner, but in 1945 joined the sales and promotion staff of the Bihari brothers' Modern Records, later producing sessions for R&B acts including Charles Brown and Hadda Brooks. In 1950 Sill met Leiber in the L.A. record shop where the aspiring lyricist worked as a retail clerk and suggested he find a partner who could read and write music, spurring the beginning of Leiber's collaboration with Mike Stoller. Sill also produced the 1951 Jimmy Witherspoon effort "Real Ugly Woman", the first recorded Leiber and Stoller collaboration. That same year Sill and Federal Records producer-talent scout Ralph Bass formed a PR agency, Brisk Enterprises, and following the success of the duo's Big Mama Thornton hit "Hound Dog", he teamed with Leiber and Stoller in late 1953 to create Spark Records as well as their own publishing firm, Quintet Music, Inc.

Spark enjoyed immediate success with The Robins' R&B smash "Riot in Cell Block #9". The group's follow-up, "Smokey Joe's Café", proved an even bigger hit, in fact too big for the small label to handle. So in 1955 Spark sold its catalog to Atlantic Records, which in turn named Sill its national sales manager while giving Leiber and Stoller an independent production deal. While the deal prompted the breakup of The Robins, members Carl Gardner and Bobby Nunn continued on as The Coasters, with Sill serving as their manager. The Coasters would emerge as one of the most popular R&B acts of the late 1950s, generating a series of wry Leiber and Stoller-penned hits including "Down in Mexico", "Yakety Yak", and "Charlie Brown".

Sill also enjoyed chart success teaming with producer-songwriter Lee Hazlewood on 1958's "Rebel Rouser", the most notable of the 15 Top 40 instrumentals headlined by guitarist Duane Eddy and issued on the Jamie label. In late 1959, Sill and Hazlewood formed Trey Records, a Hollywood-based imprint distributed by Atlantic. The label's signings included 18-year-old wunderkind Phil Spector, then fresh off the success of his group The Teddy Bears' chart-topping pop classic "To Know Him Is to Love Him." Spector produced several Trey sides. None were hits, but Kell Osborne's 1960 release "The Bells of St. Mary's" bears all the dramatic hallmarks that would later define Spector's trademark Wall of Sound aesthetic.

At the end of 1961, Sill and Hazlewood shut down Trey but quickly formed a new label, Gregmark, as a vehicle for The Paris Sisters, an Andrews Sisters-inspired sibling vocal trio with a series of little-heard Decca singles under its belt. Sill insisted on a top-to-bottom overhaul of their approach, prompting Spector to relegate Albeth and Sherrell Paris to the background while turning the spotlight on youngest sibling Priscilla, insisting she dial back her powerful voice to a dusky whisper. While the Paris Sisters' Gregmark debut "Be My Boy" earned little notice, the follow-up, "I Love How You Love Me," cracked the U.S. Top Five, galvanized by Priscilla's intimate lead turn and Spector's atypically restrained production.

Spector then began work on a Paris Sisters LP, but as production costs began to skyrocket, Sill attempted to exert control of the project. Their skirmish ended disastrously when, according to Sill, one of his assistants accidentally discarded the master tapes, although rumors persist of a far more nefarious course of action. At the same time Sill's partnership with the tempestuous Hazlewood collapsed, and despite their differences, in late 1961 Sill and Spector inaugurated their own label, Philles, immediately reaching the Top 20 with the company's debut release, The Crystals' "There's No Other (Like My Baby)." Its 1962 follow-up, "Uptown," was Spector's first true tour de force, capturing the Wall of Sound in full gallop.

By mid-1962 Philles was the most successful independent label in the U.S., scoring a series of Spector-produced classics including the Crystals' "He's a Rebel" and "Then He Kissed Me," Bob B. Soxx & the Blue Jeans' "Zip-a-Dee-Doo-Dah" and The Ronettes' "Be My Baby."

But as Spector's fame and renown grew, so did his notorious ego, and as he exerted more and more of his mercurial will over Philles' business dealings, his relationship with Sill disintegrated. Spector eventually forced his mentor out of the company altogether, buying out Sill for a paltry $60,000 (reportedly never even paid) and decisively terminating their partnership with the never-released Crystals recording "(Let's Dance) The Screw."

After over a year in seclusion, in 1964 Sill resurfaced as a consultant to Screen Gems-Columbia Music president Don Kirshner. Although the position began as a temporary one, he ended up staying with the company for over two decades, eventually taking over Kirshner's position. In 1985 Sill was named president and CEO of Jobete Music, the publishing arm of Berry Gordy, Jr.'s Motown empire. He remained with Jobete until his death in Los Angeles on October 31, 1994.

References

External links
 
 

American music industry executives
The Monkees
1918 births
1994 deaths
20th-century American musicians